Brevitalea is a genus of bacteria from the family of Arenimicrobiaceae.

See also 
 List of bacterial orders
 List of bacteria genera

References

Further reading 
 

Bacteria genera
Acidobacteriota